Emanoil Porumbaru (1845 – 11 October 1921) was a Romanian politician who served as the Minister of Foreign Affairs of Romania from 4 January 1914 until 7 December 1916 under the reign of Romanian kings Carol I and Ferdinand, and as President of the Senate of Romania from 9 December 1916 until 25 April 1918.

He died on 11 October 1921 in Bucharest. A street in Bucharest is named after Porumbaru.

See also
Foreign relations of Romania

References

1845 births
1921 deaths
Politicians from Bucharest
Romanian Ministers of Foreign Affairs
Romanian Ministers of Public Works
Presidents of the Senate of Romania